Taylor, Taylors or Taylor's may refer to:

People 
 Taylor (surname)
List of people with surname Taylor
 Taylor (given name), including Tayla and Taylah
 Taylor sept, a branch of Scottish clan Cameron
 Justice Taylor (disambiguation)

Places

Australia 
 Electoral district of Taylor, South Australia
 Taylor, Australian Capital Territory, planned suburb

Canada 
 Taylor, British Columbia

United States
 Taylor, Alabama
 Taylor, Arizona
 Taylor, Arkansas
 Taylor, Indiana
 Taylor, Louisiana
 Taylor, Maryland
 Taylor, Michigan
 Taylor, Mississippi
 Taylor, Missouri
 Taylor, Nebraska
 Taylor, North Dakota
 Taylor, New York
 Taylor, Beckham County, Oklahoma
 Taylor, Cotton County, Oklahoma
 Taylor, Pennsylvania
 Taylors, South Carolina
 Taylor, Texas
 Taylor, Utah
 Taylor, Washington
 Taylor, West Virginia
 Taylor, Wisconsin
 Taylor, Wyoming
 Taylor County (disambiguation)
 Taylor Township (disambiguation)

Businesses and organisations 
 Taylor's (department store) in Quebec, Canada
 Taylor Guitars, an American guitar manufacturer 
 Taylor University, in Upland, Indiana, U.S.
 Taylor's University, commonly referred to as Taylor's, in Subang Jaya, Selangor, Malaysia
 Taylor's College
 John Taylor & Co, or Taylor's Bell Foundry, Taylor's of Loughborough, or Taylor's, in England
 Taylor Company, a maker of foodservice equipment owned by Middleby Corporation

Science and technology
 Taylor's theorem, in calculus
 Taylor series, in mathematics
 AMD Taylor, alternate name for the Turion 64 X2 computer processor
 Taylor knock-out factor, for evaluating the stopping power of hunting cartridges

Other uses 
 Taylor Series, infinite series of polynomials which asymptotically approaches infinitely differentiable functions 
 Taylor's law, an empirical law in ecology
 Taylor rule, in economics
 Taylor Law, an article of New York State Law 
 Taylor (crater), on the Moon
 "Taylor" (song) by Jack Johnson, 2004
 , the name of several American ships

See also 

 Tailor (disambiguation)
 Taylorism, a theory of scientific management, named after Frederick Winslow Taylor
 Tylor